The women's 100 metres at the 2007 All-Africa Games were held on July 18–19.

Medalists

Results

Heats
Qualification: First 3 of each heat (Q) and the next 4 fastest (q) qualified for the semifinals.

Wind:Heat 1: 0.0 m/s, Heat 2: +1.0 m/s, Heat 3: +0.8 m/s, Heat 4: -1.4 m/s

Semifinals
Qualification: First 4 of each semifinal qualified (Q) directly for the final.

Wind:Heat 1: +0.6 m/s, Heat 2: +0.5 m/s

Final
Wind: +0.6 m/s

References
Results

100
2007